Kateryna Istomina (born 7 March 1994) is a Paralympic swimmer from Ukraine. She competes in S8 and SM8 (individual medley) events.

References

1994 births
Living people
Ukrainian female breaststroke swimmers
Ukrainian female butterfly swimmers
Ukrainian female freestyle swimmers
Ukrainian female medley swimmers
Paralympic swimmers of Ukraine
Paralympic gold medalists for Ukraine
Paralympic silver medalists for Ukraine
Medalists at the 2012 Summer Paralympics
Medalists at the 2016 Summer Paralympics
Swimmers at the 2012 Summer Paralympics
Swimmers at the 2016 Summer Paralympics
S8-classified Paralympic swimmers
Medalists at the World Para Swimming Championships
Medalists at the World Para Swimming European Championships
Paralympic medalists in swimming
Sportspeople from Kyiv
21st-century Ukrainian women